The Steere Bodacious is an American single seat original design ultralight aircraft.

Design
The Bodacious was a project started as a Legal Eagle ultralight, but was redesigned to become an enclosed aircraft. The aircraft is a single engine, strut-braced, high wing ultralight with conventional landing gear. The aluminum spar wings use wooden ribs and fold rearward for towing or storage. The aircraft is covered with Oratex, a pre-colored covering used in model aircraft building.

Operational history
The prototype Bodacious won the Reserve Grand Champion Ultralight award at the 2012 EAA AirVenture Oshkosh airshow.

Specifications (Bodacious)

See also

References

Homebuilt aircraft